Dali Benssalah ( Dali Bnessleh),  (born 8 January 1992) is a French-Algerian actor.

Biography 
Benssalah was born in Rennes to a family of Algerian descent. He was a Muay Thai martial artist champion before graduating from the Cours Florent drama school. He began working in film and television in 2013. In 2018, he appeared in  Louis Garrel's A Faithful Man and became known to international audiences for his role as assassin Primo in the James Bond movie No Time to Die.

 Selected filmography 
 2013: Petits secrets entre voisins 
 2017: Salade Tomates Oignons 
 2017: Je suis une blessure 
 2018: Red 
 2018: Nox 2018: Interrail 2018: Au revoir Tom Selleck 
 2018: A Faithful Man 2019: Flash 
 2019: Savages ("Les Sauvages")
 2019: Street Flow 2021: My Brothers and I 2021: No Time to Die 2022: Athena 2023: The Accidental Getaway Driver''

Music video 
 2017: The Blaze - "Territory"

References

External links 
 

1992 births
Living people
French male film actors
French people of Algerian descent
French martial artists
French male television actors